The Rolling Stones' 1964 3rd British Tour was a concert tour by the band. The tour commenced on August 1 and concluded on August 22, 1964. It included a single concert in The Netherlands.

The Rolling Stones
Mick Jagger - lead vocals, harmonica, percussion
Keith Richards - guitar, backing vocals
Brian Jones - guitar, harmonica, backing vocals
Bill Wyman - bass guitar, backing vocals
Charlie Watts - drums

Tour set list
Songs performed include:
Not Fade Away
Walking The Dog
I Just Want to Make Love to You
If You Need Me
Around and Around
Hi-Heel Sneakers
I Wanna Be Your Man
I'm a King Bee
"You Can Make It If You Try"
Down in the Bottom
Carol
Tell Me
It's All Over Now
Suzie Q
Can I Get a Witness

Tour dates
01/08/1964 Belfast (stop after 12 minutes due to hysteria)
03/08/1964 Longleat House
07/08/1964 London, Richmond Athletic Ground
08/08/1964 Scheveningen, Netherlands, Kurhaus, Kurzaal
09/08/1964 Manchester, Belle Vue, New Elizabethan Ballroom
10/08/1964 New Brighton, Tower Ballroom
13/08/1964 Douglas, Isle of Man, Palace Ballroom  
18/08/1964 St. Peter Port, New Theatre Ballroom, Guernsey
19/08/1964 St. Peter Port, New Theatre Ballroom, Guernsey
20/08/1964 St. Peter Port, New Theatre Ballroom, Guernsey
21/08/1964 St. Helier, Springfield Hall, Jersey
22/08/1964 St. Helier, Springfield Hall, Jersey
24/08/1964 Weymouth, Dorset

References
 Carr, Roy.  The Rolling Stones: An Illustrated Record.  Harmony Books, 1976.  

The Rolling Stones concert tours
1964 concert tours
1964 in the United Kingdom
August 1964 events in the United Kingdom